Z.C.B.J. Opera House may refer to:

Z.C.B.J. Opera House (Clarkson, Nebraska), listed on the National Register of Historic Places in Colfax County, Nebraska
Z.C.B.J. Opera House (Verdigre, Nebraska), listed on the National Register of Historic Places in Knox County, Nebraska

See also
List of Z.C.B.J. buildings
ZCBJ Hall (disambiguation)